Qaleh-ye Mohammad Ali or Qaleh Mohammad Ali may refer to:
 Qaleh-ye Mohammad Ali, Fars
 Qaleh-ye Mohammad Ali, Kermanshah

See also
 Qaleh-ye Mohammad Ali Khan